Lyudmila Rogozhina (born 27 May 1959 in Dnipropetrovsk, Ukrainian SSR) is a Ukrainian and Soviet former basketball player who competed in the 1980 Summer Olympics.

References

1959 births
Living people
Ukrainian women's basketball players
Olympic basketball players of the Soviet Union
Basketball players at the 1980 Summer Olympics
Olympic gold medalists for the Soviet Union
Olympic medalists in basketball
Sportspeople from Dnipro
Soviet women's basketball players
Medalists at the 1980 Summer Olympics